The Talk of the Town is a 1942 American comedy-drama film directed by George Stevens and starring Cary Grant, Jean Arthur, and Ronald Colman, with a supporting cast featuring Edgar Buchanan and Glenda Farrell. The screenplay was written by  Irwin Shaw and Sidney Buchman (adaptation by Dale Van Every) from a story by Sidney Harmon. The picture was released by Columbia Pictures. This was the second time that Grant and Arthur were paired in a film, after Only Angels Have Wings (1939).

Plot
Mill worker and political activist Leopold Dilg (Cary Grant) is accused of arson and murder, setting fire to a woolen mill, killing the mill foreman, Clyde Bracken. In the middle of the trial, Dilg escapes from jail and seeks shelter in a remote cottage owned by former schoolmate Nora Shelley (Jean Arthur), on whom he has had a crush for years. Shelley, now a schoolteacher, has rented the unoccupied cottage for the summer to distinguished law professor Michael Lightcap (Ronald Colman), who plans to use this secluded location to write a book. Both Lightcap and Dilg arrive within minutes of each other, so Shelley decides to hide Dilg in the attic.

When Dilg is spotted by Lightcap, Shelley passes him off as her gardener, Joseph. A visitor suddenly arrives, Senator Boyd. The senator informs Lightcap that he is about to be nominated to the Supreme Court by the president.  Meanwhile, Lightcap and Dilg enjoy having spirited discussions about the law, Lightcap arguing from an academic viewpoint, with Dilg subscribing to a more practical approach. As a result of their spirited debates, they become good friends, but also romantic rivals, as Lightcap falls in love with Nora.

As a result of prodding by Shelley and Dilg's lawyer, Lightcap becomes suspicious of mill owner Andrew Holmes, foreman Clyde Bracken and Regina Bush.  In spite of his initial reluctance, Lightcap starts to investigate the charges against Dilg. As a ruse, he romances Bush, the girlfriend of the supposed murder victim and discovers that foreman Bracken is still alive and hiding in Boston. Shelley, Lightcap and Dilg go to Boston and find him. They bring him back to Lochester and get him to admit his guilt and that of the mill owner for setting the fire.

While the three argue about whether to call the police, Bracken catches them unawares, knocks them unconscious and escapes. Dilg is held for trial while the town's anger at him is stoked into a riotous mob.  Lightcap takes a gun from the cottage and seeks out the foreman, forcing him at gunpoint to go to the courthouse just as the mob is about to break in to lynch Dilg.

Firing the revolver to draw attention, Lightcap announces that the supposedly dead foreman is now present.  He then gives an impassioned speech to the mob about the importance of the law, both in principle and in practice.  In due course, the foreman and owner of the mill are indicted and Dilg is set free.

Soon afterwards Lightcap is appointed to the Supreme Court. Shelley visits him in his chambers and he tells her that his dream of 20 years has been realized.  With more happiness than a man could want, he says the only thing left is to see his friends likewise happy, and suggests that Shelley should marry Dilg.

While both Dilg and Shelley are attending court at the first seating of Lightcap as an Associate Justice, Dilg interprets an affectionate look shared between Lightcap and Shelley as a sign that she has chosen to marry Lightcap, and leaves the courtroom abruptly. Shelley follows him, and Dilg eventually realises that she has chosen him.

Cast

Production
The Talk of the Town began with the working title "Mr. Twilight", but Cary Grant insisted it be changed, suspecting that, if the movie appeared to be about a single male character, Colman, who had the better role, would steal the show.

While Grant was paid $106,250 for The Talk of the Town and Colman $100,000, Arthur earned only $50,000, partly as a result of ongoing conflict with studio head Harry Cohn.

The title The Talk of the Town was registered to Universal Studios, and Columbia had to give them the rights to use Sin Town in return. Other titles considered for the film included "Three's a Crowd", "The Gentlemen Misbehave", "Justice Winks an Eye", "In Love with You", "You're Wonderful", "A Local Affair", "The Woman's Touch", "Morning for Angels", "Scandal in Lochester", "The Lochester Affair", and even "Nothing Ever Happens".

Principal photography, originally scheduled to begin January 17, 1942, was delayed following news of the death of Carole Lombard in a plane crash while selling war bonds in the Midwest. Stevens, who had directed Lombard in the 1940 film, Vigil in the Night, halted work on the set and sent both cast and crew home.

The role of Colman's valet, played by Rex Ingram, was at the time a rare example of a non-stereotypical part for an African-American actor. Also unusual was the presence of two leading men: at this point in their careers both Grant and Colman had been used to having that role all to themselves. The situation is reflected in the plot, since audiences are kept guessing until the end who Arthur's character would choose to marry. Stevens filmed both versions, leaving it to test screenings to determine the ending.

Stevens and Arthur, both known for perfectionism and attention to detail, enjoyed a close working relationship on The Talk of the Town, with Arthur calling Stevens as her "favorite director" and Stevens describing Arthur as "the finest actress he ever worked with". They reunited on The More the Merrier (1943) and Shane (1953) − for which Arthur came out of semi-retirement.

Reception

Critical assessments
According to Bosley Crowther, "the essential purpose of this tale is to amuse with some devious dilemmas, and that it does right well"; he called the script "smart and lively." According to Variety, the film's "transition from serious or melodramatic to the slap-happy and humorous sometimes is a bit awkward, but in the main it is solid escapist comedy."

Academy Awards
Nominations
 Outstanding Motion Picture: Columbia
 Best Writing (Original Motion Picture Story): Sidney Harmon
 Best Writing (Screenplay): Irwin Shaw, Sidney Buchman
 Best Art Direction (Black-and-White): Art Direction: Lionel Banks, Rudolph Sternad; Interior Decoration: Fay Babcock
 Best Cinematography (Black-and-White): Ted Tetzlaff
 Best Film Editing: Otto Meyer
 Best Music (Music Score of a Dramatic or Comedy Picture): Frederick Hollander, Morris Stoloff

Screenwriter Sidney Buchman (who co-wrote the script with Irwin Shaw) was blacklisted in the 1950s. Consequently, Buchman, one of the men who penned Mr. Smith Goes to Washington (1939), left the U.S. and began working in Fox's European division. Buchman would remain in France until his death in 1975.

References
Notes

Bibliography

See also
Supreme Court of the United States in fiction

External links

 
 
 
 
 
 The Talk of the Town  on Lux Radio Theater: May 17, 1943

1940s American films
1940s English-language films
1940s romantic comedy-drama films
1940s satirical films
1942 films
1942 comedy films
1942 drama films
American romantic comedy-drama films
American satirical films
American black-and-white films
Columbia Pictures films
Films about lawyers
Films about miscarriage of justice
Films directed by George Stevens
Films scored by Friedrich Hollaender
Films set in New England
Films with screenplays by Sidney Buchman
Films with screenplays by Irwin Shaw
Films scored by Morris Stoloff